Martshala Gewog (Dzongkha: མར་ཚྭ་ལ་) is a gewog (village block) of Samdrup Jongkhar District, Bhutan. It also composed part of Bhangtar Dungkhag, along with Dalim and Samrang Gewogs

References

Gewogs of Bhutan
Samdrup Jongkhar District